Below is a partial list of shows that were previously aired on Philippine television network, People's Television Network. For the currently aired shows of this network, see List of programs broadcast by People's Television Network.

Local defunct shows

Newscasts
 Balitaan (2013–2014)
 Batingaw (2008–2010)
 Business @ 10 (2008)
 Business News (2002–2003)
 Daily Info (2017–2020)
 The DPI Mid-Day Report (1978)
 Early Evening Report (1986–1987)
 The Final Report (1997–1998)
 Late Evening Report (1986–1987)
 Malacañang: The Week That Was (2008–2010)
 Midnight Update (1987–1989)
 Minuto (2007–2010)
 Money Matters (2008–2010)
 National Network News (1998–2001)
 NBN Business (2005–2006)
 NBN Network News (2001–2005)
 NBN News Live (2001–2007)
 NBN Sports (2008–2010)
 News @ 1 (2012–2016)
 News @ 1: Junior Edition (2013–2014)
 News @ 1: The Week that Was (2013–2014)
 News @ 6 (2012–2016)
 NewsLife (2012–2016)
 Newsbreak Bilingual (1995–1998)
 News Flash sa 4 (1998–2001)
 News on 4 (1987–1995)
 Newscenter 4
 Newscenter 3: Cebu (1980–1986)
 Newscenter 4: Bacolod (1980–1986)
 Newscenter 4: Evening Edition (1980–1986)
 Newscenter 4: Final Edition (1980–1986)
 Newscenter 4: Morning Edition (1980–1986)
 Newscenter 4: Noon Edition in Filipino (1980–1986)
 News Today
 News Today: Evening Edition (1974–1980)
 News Today: Final Edition (1974–1980)
 News Today: Morning Edition (1974–1980)
 News Today: Noon Edition in Filipino (1974–1980)
 PAGASA I-Weather (2012)
 Panahon.TV (2012–2016)
 Pangunahing Balita Ala-Una (1987–1998)
 Pangunahing Balita (1987–1998)
 Pambansang Balita Ala-Una (1998–2001)
 Pambansang Balita Ala-Sais (1998–2001)
 PTV News (1995–1998,  2016–2017,  2017–2020)
 PTV Newsbreak (1989–1998,  2012–2020)
 PTV News Cebu (1995–1998)
 PTV News Bacolod (1995–1998)
 PTV News Headlines (2017–2020)
 PTV News Nationwide (1995–1998)
 PTV Sports Weekend (2022)
 PTV Weekend Report (1987–1994)
 PNA Newsroom (produced by Philippine News Agency, 2017–2022)
 RadyoBisyon (2014–2017)
 Teledyaryo (2001–2012)
 Teledyaryo Ala-Una (2001–2004)
 Teledyaryo Ala-Sais (2001–2004)
 Teledyaryo 4:30pm (2004–2006)
 Teledyaryo 5:00pm (2006–2008)
 Teledyaryo Alas-Dose (2007–2008)
 Teledyaryo Alas-Nuwebe (2005–2008)
 Teledyaryo Business (2006–2008, 2010–2012)
 Teledyaryo Final Edition (2005–2008, 2010–2012)
 Teledyaryo Linggo (2005–2007)
 Teledyaryo News Bulletin (2010–2012)
 Teledyaryo ng Bayan (2005–2007)
 Teledyaryo Panlalawigan (2005–2008)
 Teledyaryo Primetime (2007–2008)
 Teledyaryo Sabado (2005–2007)
 Teledyaryo Sports (2006–2008,  2010–2012)
 Teledyaryo Weekend (2009–2012)
 The Weekend News (2012–2016)

News specials
 DA Presser (2020-2022)
 DSWD Presser (2020-2021)
 President Duterte's Talk to the People (2020-2022)

Public affairs
 45 Minutos (2004–2005)
 Abante Pilipinas (2008–2010)
 Ang Batasan (1982–1985)
 Ang Paghahanda para sa Hatol ng Bayan (2013)
 Ang Pandayan ni Mang Pandoy (1993–1997)
 Ang Tao't Kalikasan (2011; re-run, 2012)
 ASEAN Spotlight (2016–2019)
 Bantay Kongreso (1988)
 Batas Barangay (2005)
 Ben Tulfo Unfiltered (2018)
 Bitag Live (produced by Bitag Multimedia Network, 2017-2023)
 BizNews (2009–2015; 2017–2019; 2019–2020)
 Boses (2007–2008)
 Business and Beyond (2016–2017)
 Bridging Borders (2015–2017)
 Business Insights (1987)
 Business Talks (1984–1986)
 Cabinet Report sa TeleRadyo (2018, 2019–2022)
 Celebrity
 COMELEC Hour (2013)
 Crime Desk (2018–2019)
 Congress Forum
 Congress In Action with Freddie Abando (2009–2012)
 Convergence (2008–2011)
 Dagundong (2005–2008)
 Dakila Ka Pinoy! (1993–1997)
 Dial M (1996–1998, 2003–2010)
 A Dialogue with Pres. C. Aquino (1986–1987)
 Dighay Bayan (1996–2005)
 Diwa ng Katotohanan (1988–1994)
 Diyos at Bayan (2001–2002)
 Equilibrium: Sukatan ng Katwiran (2008–2012)
 The Estrada Presidency (1998–2001)
 The Executive Report
 Explore with Mike (2001–2003)
 Face the Nation (1977–1986)
 The Final Say, Cha-Cha! (2006–2007)
 FVR Up Close (1992–1998)
 Gov @ Work (2013–2014)
 Headline (1986–1995)
 Headlines Expose (2004–2005)
 Insider Exclusive Kapihan (2017–2019; also aired on RJTV)
 Inquiry (1984–1986)
 Isyu Ngayon (2008–2010)
 Isyu One-on-One with Ceasar Soriano (produced by GreatCzar Media Productions, 2019-2022, 2022)
 Jeep ni Erap (1999–2000)
 Job Network (1992–1999)
 KB Kaibigan (1986)
 Kalikasan, Kaunlaran by Earth Institute Asia (1992–1999)
 Kapayapaan Atin Ito (2001–2009)
 Kapihan ng Bayan (2006–2010)
 Kapihan sa Maynila (1987)
 Katapatan sa Watawat at Lipunan (K.A.W.A.L.) (2007–2008)
 Kita Mo Na, Galing ng Pinoy (2011–2012)
 Know Your Candidates (2022)
 Komentaryo (2000–2001, 2008–2011)
 KWATRObersyal (2015–2017)
 Laging Handa Dokyu (produced by Presidential Communications Operations Office, 2020-2022)
 LIGA: Blocktime Commetators
 Lingkod Bayan ni Tony Falcon (2014)
 Magandang Gabi Pilipinas with Ceasar Soriano (produced by GreatCzar Media Productions, 2019-2022, 2022)
 Manila Envelope (1985–1986)
 Meet the Press (1982–1988, 2008–2010)
 Nation's Peacekeeper's: Heroes at our Time (2012)
 Network Line (1982)
 No Holds Barred (1986–1987)
 ONE Asean (2017–2018)
 Paliwanag: The 2022 Election Townhall Series (2022)
 Pananaw (2008–2009)
 Pangungusap ng Pangulo (1987–1992)
 Patrol 117 (2001–2002)
 People, Politics and Power (2010–2012)
 People's Government Mobile Action (2008–2010)
 People's Hour
 Perspectives (2008–2009)
 Pilipinas Ngayon Na! (2007–2009, 2010–2011)
 Pros & Cons with Usec. Joel Sy Egco (2018–2019)
 PTV Special Forum (2012–2016)
 Public Access (1999)
 Public Eye (1986)
 Pulis Ako, Pulis Nyo Po (2011–2012)
 Pulsong Masa
 Pulong Pulong sa Kaunlaran (1970s)
 Pulsong Pinoy (2011–2013)
 Punto Legal (2008–2009)
 Radyo Bandido sa Telebisyon (2008)
 Report Kay Boss (2013–2016)
 Republic Service (2008–2009)
 Sa Likod ng Istorya (2012)
 Sa Totoo Lang kasama si Erwin Tulfo (2017–2018)
 Saklolo Abugado (2003–2005)
 Say Mo, Sec? (2014)
 Special Report: Ulat ni Eroll Dacame (2013)
 Straight to the Point (2010–2011)
 Taas Noo, Bulakenyo! (2007–2008)
 Taas Noo, Pilipino! (2007–2008)
 Takip Silip (2008–2011)
 Talakayan sa Makati
 Talakayan sa Isyung Pulis (2007–2011)
 Tinig Bayan (1986–1993)
 Tinig ng Bayan (2005–2007)
 Tipanan sa Barangay (2001)
 TranspoDOTCom (2006–2009)
 Trends (1984–1986)
 Tugon (1986)
 Tutok Erwin Tulfo (2018, 2020-2022)
 Ugnayang Pambansa (2001–2003)
 United Nations Hour (1987)
 The Veronica Chronicles (2012–2017)
 Usapang Kongreso (1990–1994)
 Usapang Pulitika (2009–2010)
 Uswag Pinas (2021)
 WomanWatch with Nikki Coseteng: It's About Time (1987–1994)
 The Working President (2001–2010)
 Yaman sa Kailaliman (2018–2019)

Morning shows
 AM @ NBN (2002–2003)
 AM @ PTV (1998–1999)
 Bagong Pilipinas (2017–2020)
 Good Morning Boss (2013–2016)
 Good Morning Manila (1980–1986)
 Good Morning Pilipinas (2000–2001,  2016–2017)
 Metro One (2012–2013)
 Mornings @ PTV (1999–2000)
 The Morning Show (1974–1978,  2005–2007,  2010–2012)
 New Day @ NBN (2001–2002)
 New Day @ PTV (2001)
 One Morning (2007–2009)
 One Morning Cafe (2009–2010)
 Teleaga (2003–2005)
 Windows with Johnny Revilla (1988–1995)

Travel and lifestyle shows
 At the Top (2015)
 Baguio (1987)
 Beautiful Batangas (2011)
 Biyahero (2013–2014)
 Biyaheng Negosyo (2016)
 Biyaheng Langit (2013–2019)
 Borderless Adventure (2012)
 BRM BRM TV: Biyahe Rider Motorsiklo (2013)
 Buhay Abroad (2018)
 Buhay Pinoy (2012–2019)
 Business & Leisure (1998–2007)
 CameraGeekTV: Pinoy Best Shot (2012–2014)
 Chinoy TV (2014–2017)
 Coast to Coast with Dada Lorenzana
 Cooltura (2019, courtesy of IBC 13)
 Entrepinas TV (2022)
 Fitness and Health, Good Life, Good Health, True Health, Health and Fitness (2013–2014)
 F Talk (2018–2019)
 Green&Fab (2015)
 I-Connect: Balitang Social Media (2012–2013)
 It's a Real Deal (1983)
 ITravel Pinas (2017–2018)
 Kahanga-hangang Pilipinas (2014–2015)
 KooPinoy: ACDI MPC's Cooperative TV (2022)
 Kris10 (2013)
 Lakbay Pinas (2014)
 Lumad TV (2017–2019)
 Like Pinas (2017–2018)
 Living Asia Channel (2011–2012)
 LWYD: Loving What You Do (2018)
 Magsasaka TV (2018)
 Nature Trip (2000)
 Neighbours (2008–2011)
 Out of Town
 Pet Pals TV (season 2) (2022)
 Pinoy T.A.L.K. (Travel, Adventure, Leisure, Knowledge) (2011–2012)
 Salaam TV (2017-2021)
 She...Ka! (2007–2011)
 Wide, Wonderful World (1977–1979)

Comedy
 2+2=4 (1986-1988)
 Bara Bara Anything Goes (2015–2016)
 Bhoy (1991–1992)
 Champoy (1980-1981)
 Da Young Once (1986–1987)
 Estudyante Blues (1990–1992, produced by Viva Television)
 Hoy, Hindi
 Last Two Minites (1990, produced by Regal Television)
 Love Me Doods (1990–1991)
 Naku, Ha
 Oks na Oks (1988)
 Strangebrew (2001–2003)

Action and drama
 Ang Pangarap Kong Jackpot (1995–1998; 2010)
 Balintataw (1987–1993)
 Brocka Presents (1978–1979)
 Bubungang Lata (1989)
 Count My Blessings (2008–2009)
 Dapitan 1896 (1982)
 Diyos Ko, Mahal Mo Ba Sila? (2005–2007)
 Dulansining (1977–1978)
 Hilda (1979)
 Ikaw ang Mahal Ko (1994–1995)
 Ito ang Inyong Tia Dely
 Kadenang Rosas (1990–1991)
 Krusada Kontra Korupsyon (2007–2008)
 Krusada Kontra Krimen (2005–2007)
 May Sayad
 Mga Kwentong Buhay (1986–1987)
 Mikaela (1999–2000)
 Mukha ng Buhay (1996, produced by Viva Television)
 NBI Files (1991–1992, produced by Viva Television)
 Pabrika (1986)
 Pira-pirasong Pangarap (1983, not to be confused with the GMA drama anthology of the same name)
 Salamin ng Buhay
 Sa Direksyon ni Lino Brocka (1990, produced by Viva Television)
 Tierra Sangre (1996, produced by Viva Television)
 To Sir with Love
 Viva Drama Specials (1990–1992, produced by Viva Television)

Animated series
 BIDA: Batang Iwas Droga (2003–2004)

Variety
 Big Ike's Happening (1986)
 Dance Vision (1995)
 Discovision
 Dito Kami! (1986–1987)
 Last Full Show (1999–2003)
 Last Wave 1986 (1986)
 Love, Lea (1983–1985)
 Maria! Maria! (1986–1987)
 Midnight Session (1990-1992)
 Music and Memories (2008–2009)
 The Other Side of Alma (1981–1983)
 Patok na Patok (1982)
 Penthouse Party (2012)
 Relaks Lang (1998–1999)
 She! (1981–1985)
 Show Up: Ang Bagong Game Show ng Bayan (2012–2013)
 Si Direk Kasi!
 Sing! Sing! (2007–2008)
 Star Brighters (1988–1991)
 Starliner... Man and Woman (1977–1978)
 Start of Something Big (1986–1990)
 Take Four (2001–2002)
 Tayo't Magsaya (1987)
 This Is It! (1986–1987)
 TSAS (The Sunday Afternoon Show) (2015, produced by Secarats Talent Management Services)
 Sundown (2020, 2021-2022, produced by Sagisag)

Reality
 Tanghalan ng Kapalaran

Talk shows
 Ang Say ng Kabataan (A.S.K.) (2006–2008)
 Balitalakay (2008–2010)
 Communications and News Exchange Forum (2010–2011)
 Dagundong (2005–2008)
 The Daily Show with Trevor Noah (2018-2022)
 Fora Medica (1999–2001)
 Friends with TVJ and Charo (1978)
 Kris (1996, produced by Viva Television)
 The Medyo Late Night Show with Jojo A. All The Way! (2018)
 Meet the Press (1982–1988, 2008–2010)
 Metro Magazine (1978, produced by the Metro Manila Commission (now Metro Manila Development Authority)
 Miss Ellaneous (1981–1984)
 Mystica's Mystic Road to Success (2013)
 Network Forum
 The New Seeing Stars with Joe Quirino
 She! (1981–1985,  2000–2005)
 She Said, She Said (2010–2012)
 Sigaw: The Campus Debate Series (2001–2002)
 SustainabiliTV (2013)
 Take 2 For The Road (1979–1984)
 Talakayan sa Isyung Pulis (2007–2011)
 Talakayan sa Makati (1987)
 Talk Ko 'To! (2007–2008)
 XYZ Young Women's TV (1996–2001)
 The Young Once (2007–2009)
 Youth Voice (2006–2007)

Game shows
 All-New Bingonaryo
 Battle of the Brains (2000–2001)
 imGAME (2002–2003)
 Nature World (1977–1979)
 Online Bingo Filipino (1999–2001, HOOK-UP WITH, SMNI 39)
 Online Bingo Filipino (1999-2001, hook-up, with SMNI 39)
 Bingo Filipino (1999-2001, hook-up with, SMNI 39/PTV-4/DWBC 1422 KHZ (1972-2007)/DZME 1530KHZ/DZRJ810AM/SkyCableSunCableandSunvisionCableChannel8/Channel95
 Pamantayan ng Talino (1977–1978)
 Premyo sa Resibo (2006)
 Sa Linggo ang Bola
 Show Up: Ang Bagong Game Show ng Bayan (2012–2013)
 Talo Na, Panalo Pa! (1994–1995)
 The Doctor is In: Made More Fun (Department of Health) (2014–2015, 2016–2017, 2018, 2019)

Educational shows
 Agri Link (1993–1999)
 Agrikultura ETC (2012–2014)
 Ani at Kita (2019)
 Ating Alamin (1980–1991, 2009–2016)
 Code Red (2009–2010)
 Constel (1995–1998; re-aired, 2012–2015)
 Chemistry in Action
 English
 Fun with Math
 Physics in Everyday Life
 Science Made Easy
 For Art's Sake
 Go Negosyo Bigtime (2008–2009)
 Go Organic! (2009)
 Ito-Iyon: Ang Galing! (1983–1985)
 Kita Mo Na, Galing ng Pinoy (2011)
 Kusina Atbp. (1989–2002)
 Kusina sa Kanayunan (2018)
 Lutong Bahay (1998–2002)
 Lutong-Luto with CJ Hirro (2019–2020)
 Maunlad na Agrikultura (2008–2009)
 Mommy Academy (2003–2005)
 Negosyo ATBP. (2005–2009)
 OneDA sa TV (2022)
 Padayon: The NCCA Hour (produced by National Commission for Culture and the Arts, 2021, 2022)
 Sci-pol: Science Serving People (2001–2002)
 Sining Gising: NCCA Ugnayan sa Tinig ng Bayan (2007–2011)
 Tele-Agri
 Tele-Aralan ng Kakayahan (1980–1989)
 Tele-Kusina (2002–2003)
 Tipong Pinoy (1998)

Kids' programs
 Abakada Barkada
 Balitang Bata
 Batibot (1984–1991,  1994–1995)
 Eskwela ng Bayan (2002–2003)
 Alikabuk
 Karen's World
 Solved
 Why?
 KNN: Kabataan News Network
 Pin Pin (1990–1992)
 Salamat Mr. Robot (collab with UP Institute of Science and Math) (1984)

Musical shows
 Barangayan (1982)
 Concert At The Park (1977–1990,  1991–2012)
 In The Raw (2001–2004)
 Independent Music Hub (2011)
 Islamusik (2005)
 Music and Memories (2008)
 Music Hitmakers
 Music Link (2011)
 Musika ng Lahi (1980)
 Paco Park Presents (1991–2012)
 Patok na Patok (1982)

Public service
 @ Ur Serbis (2008–2012)
 Amerika Atbp. (2008–2012)
 Asenso Pinoy (2009–2015)
 Balikatan: Sa Bahay at Buhay (1999–2011)
 Bagong Bayani TV (2018-2019)
 Bantay OCW with Susan K.: Ang Boses ng OFW (2005–2013)
 Bitag (2012–2019)
 Cabinet Report sa Teleradyo (2018, 2019-2022)
 Damayan Ngayon (1975–2010, 2017–2020)
 Digong 8888 Hotline (2019-2022)
 DILG: Tayo Na! (2019)
 Gabay at Aksyon (2013–2016)
 Healthline (2017)
 I-ARTA Na 'Yan! (2022)
 ICAD Advocacy TV (2021)
 Ikaw at ang Batas
 Isumbong Mo Kay Tulfo (2021)
 Kalusugan Mo, Sagot Ko (Philhealth) (2017–2018)
 Kamao Reloaded (2005–2006)
 Kasangga Mo ang Langit (2013–2019)
 Kaya Natin 'To!
 Kilos Pronto (2017–2018)
 Lingkud Bayanihan (2021)
 Linya ng Pagbabago (2017–2019)
 Makabayang Doktor (2007–2008)
 Magbuhay Professional (2003–2004)
 May Gloria Ang Bukas Mo (2001–2002)
 MMDA: On The Road! (2002–2009)
 Nora Mismo (2002)
 Network Briefing News (2020-2022)
 Ombudsman: Kakampi mo Laban sa Katiwalian  (2009–2011)
 Operation: Bigay Buhay
 Passport on Wheels: An APO Documentary (2019–2020)
 Patrol 117 (2001–2004)
 Payo Alternatibo (2016–2019)
 People's Privilege Hour (1986–1990)
 Philippines' Most Wanted (1998–2002)
 Pinoy US Cops: Ride Along (2012–2018)
 Problema N'yo, Sagot Ko! (2003–2005)
 Puso ng Bayan PCSO Caravan (2012)
 Serbisyo Muna (2005–2008)
 Sulong Pilipinas! (2019)
 Talking Points: Ang Tinig ng Serbisyo Publiko (2011–2012)
 Task Force Siyasat (2002–2003)
 The Breaking Point (2016–2017)
 Tinig ng Marino sa PTV (2019)
 Tugon sa Pangarap (2012)
 Tutok PDEA: Kontra Droga (2020-2022)
 Usapang SSS (2018–2019)

Sports shows
 86th Philippine Open (2001)
 Andy at Bobok sa Karera
 ASEAN Basketball League (2010–2012, Philippines games only)
 Auto Focus (1998–2005)
 Bigtime Boxing
 Chess Today (1977–1978)
 Eumorpho Lakas Tao
 Filsports Basketball Association (2015)
 Fistorama (2002–2011)
 Go Extreme sa Alabang (2002)
 Golf Power Plus: Cantada Beach Volleyball (2007–2011)
 Harbour Center Greatest Games (2011)
 Ice Hockey (1978–1982)
 In This Corner (2001–2015)
 Inside NCAA (2000–2001)
 Jai Alai: The Game of a Thousand Thrills (2000–2001)
 Karera, Atbp. (1997)
 Liga Pilipinas Basketball (2008–2009)
 MLB on PTV (1977–1986, 1987–1994)
 MBA on PTV/NBN (1999–2002) (with ABS-CBN Sports)
 MBS Sports (1981–1985)
 Motoring Today (1987–2006,  2008–2009)
 Motorsiklo News TV (2015–2016)
 Muay Thai (1996–2005)
 NBA Action (2001–2002)
 NBA Inside Stuff (2001–2002)
 NBA Jam (2001–2002)
 NBA on NBN (2001–2002)
 NCAA Games (1995, 2000–2001) (with Vintage Television and Silverstar Sports)
 NFL on MBS/PTV (1977–1986, 1987–1988)
 Pagcor Jai-Alai (1990–1995)
 Palarong Pintakasi (1985–1987)
 PBA on NBN/IBC (2003)
 PBL Games (1990–1992, 1994–1995, 1997–1999, 2000–2003) (with Vintage Television and Silverstar Sports)
 Philippines Football League (2017)
 Pinoy Sports Idols
 Pinoy Wrestling (1989–1990; reruns of this show are currently broadcast on RJTV 29)
 Race Weekend (1995–1996)
 Ringside TV Boxing (known as Ringside at Elorde) (1989–1995)
 Search for Tanduay The No.1 Rhum Billard Player (2003–2004)
 SEL-J Motorsports (2010–2011)
 Shakey's Girls V-League (2014–2015)
 Shakey's V-League (2007–2011)
 Smashing Action! (1989–1995, 2006)
 Speed by MP Turbo (1998–2007)
 Spikers' Turf (2015)
 Sportacular Asia (1994–1999, 2005)
 Sports Kids (1998–2001)
 Team Pilipinas (2021)
 The Sports List (2005–2007)
 Sports with Romy Kintanar
 Stop Over Beijing (2008)
 Sultada (2000)
 Tahor: Your Ultimate Gamefowl Show (2016–2018)
 Tapatan: Walang Atrasan Boxing (2000)
 Tennis Review
 UAAP Games (1995—1999) (with Silverstar Sports)
 Ultimate Fighting Championship
 Unlimited Diving (2003–2009)

Religious shows
 3 O'Clock Divine Mercy Prayer (1986–2014)
 Ang Dating Daan (1999–2000, 2003, 2013)
 Ang Iglesia ni Cristo (1983–1990)
 Answers with Bayless Conley
 Don Stewart's Power & Mercy
 The Ensign (1986–1997, produced by the Church of Jesus Christ of Latter-day Saints)
 Faith is Worth Living
 Family Matters (2010–2014)
 Family Rosary Crusade (1987–2014)
 The Fred Price Hour (1987)
 Friends Again (2007–2008)
 Heart To Heart Talk (2008–2011)
 Divine Mercy Live TV Mass (2003–2007)
 The Hour of Great Mercy (1987–2003)
 The Hour of Truth with Pastor Apollo C. Quiboloy (1999–2001)
 Jesus The Healer (2014)
 JMM Covers (2014–2015)
 Kasama Natin ang Diyos (2013–2014)
 Kenneth Copeland 
 Lakbay Simbahan (with TV Maria, 2013)
 Talitha Kum Healing Mass on TV (2002–2019)
 LDS Reunited (1999–2000)
 Mama Mary Holy Mass (2008–2010)
 Marilyn Hickey
 Oras ng Himala (2007–2021)
 Oras ng Katotohanan (2004, 2013–2018)
 Pasugo: Ang Tinig Ng Iglesia Ni Cristo (1999–2002)
 Panalangin (2014–2017)
 Powerline with Pastor Apollo C. Quiboloy (1999–2001)
 Prayer For The Holy Souls in Purgatory (2002–2014)
 Sa Inyong Mga Kamay (2013)
  The Word Exposed with Cardinal Antonio G. Tagle
 The Key of David (2012–2019)
 Sambuhay TV Mass (2011, moved to TV Maria; also aired on GMA 7 in 2020)
 Who's Calling (2015–2017)
 World Mission Society Church of God - PTV special documentary (March 2013)

Youth oriented
 Ang Say ng Kabataan (A.S.K.) (2006–2008)
 KNN: Kabataan News Network (2005–2007)
 Next Stop (with National Geographic Channel) (2005–2008)
 Rhythm Of The City (1981–1987, in cooperation with 99.5 RT/Y101)
 Sigaw: The Campus Debate Series (2001–2002)
 Teentime with Snooky and Albert (1986–1989)
 Trip Ko 'To! (2004–2005)
 Upload (2014)
 Young Minds Inspired (2013)
 The Young Once (2007–2009)
 Youth Voice (2006–2007)

Other programs
 All You Need Is Love (1982)
 Friendly Connections (1986)
 Kakaibang Lunas (King's Herbal) (2013–2018)
 The Isla Hour (2002–2006)
 Saving ASEAN Natural Treasures (2011–2012)

Movie trailer shows
 Cine Movie Trailers (produced by Crystal Sky Multimedia, 2013)
 Uncut: Movie in the Making (1998-2001)

Teleshopping
 EZ Shop (2004–2015, 2018–2019)
 Metro TV Shopping (1999–2004)
 New Life TV Shopping O Shopping (2016)
 Proactiv infomercial (2007–2009)
 Shop@Home Shop Japan (2015–2017)
 TV Shop Philippines (2015–2018, 2019)
 Value Vision TV Shopping (1996–2010)
 Winner TV Shopping (2005–2014)

Film movie blocks and specials
 Aliwan Sa PTV Afternoon Delight Cinema Greats Golden Cinema Last Full Show (1977–1978)
 Maharlika Theater MBS Movie of the Week MBS Primetime Movie (1980–1986)
 Movie House Mystery Theater (1989)
 PTV's Best (1989–1999)
 Pelikulang Pansabado (1978)
 Premiere Theater (1977–1978)
 Pilipino Box Office Primetime Movie Primetime Specials Saturday Spectacular Specials Sine Aksyon sa Kuatro (1987–1992)
 Sine Ginto (1999–2000)
 Sine Huwebes sa Kuatro (1989–1992)
 Teatro sa KwatroRegional programming
 The Governor Reports (1981–1986)
 Kalamboan Dala Tanan (PTV Davao, 2017-2020)
 PTV Cordillera Newsbreak (PTV Cordillera, 2017–2020)
 PTVisMin Newsbreak (PTV Davao, 2017–2020)
 Sugbo (2009–2010)

Foreign/canned shows
 The A-Team The Adventures of Brisco County Airwolf American Gladiators Batman Beauty and the Beast Black Beauty Buck Rogers (1987–1991)
 Burke's Law Charles in Charge The Charmings Cheers (1983–1995)
 China Documentary (2010–2011)
 Coronet Blue (1979)
 The Cosby Show (1992–1996)
 Cybill (2000)
 Discoveries: America Alaska (produced by the VOA; 2013)
 Double Dare Down the Shore Dreams Drive Home Movies Dumb and Dumber Fairie Tale Theatre Family Ties (1986-1988)
 Ferris Buller Finders Keepers Fox News on NBN (2001–2003)
 Gold and Glory in Greece (2004)
 The Green Hornet (1979)
 Growing Pains Halo Halo House (2016)
 HBO: Boxing (2000)
 Head of the Class Houston Knights Hunter The Incredible Hulk (1979)
 Island Son The Jackie Thomas Show Kelly Kidsongs (1990–1993)
 Knight Rider Land of the Giants Let's Go (1983–1985)
 Lifestyles of the Rich and Famous Masterpiece Mini-Series Max Headroom Midnight Caller Mr. Bean Mr. Wizard's World The Munsters Today Mussolini: The Untold Story NBN-KBS Documentaries (2008–2009, co-produced with KBS)
 Neon Rider Nickelodeon on PTV-4 Out of Control People and Places Pico Pico Pon Pinwheel Police Academy The Powers of Matthew Star The Professionals PTV-KBS Documentaries (2014–2016, co-produced with KBS)
 Road To Sydney (2000)
 Small Wonder Star Trek: Deep Space Nine Star Trek: The Next Generation Street Legal Sunshine Factory Superboy Superstars The Swiss Family Robinson Sword of Justice (1982)
 The Time Tunnel Together We Stand Vietnam Documentary (2015)
 Villa Alegre Voyage to the Bottom of the Sea Ultimate Fighting Championship Who's The Boss (1989–1990)
 Windows You Can't Do That on TelevisionAnime
 Combattler V Daimos Force Five Gatchaman Thunderbirds 2086 Voltes VSuper Sentai/Tokusatsu
 Jetman (1996–1997) (Tagalog Version)
 Skyranger Gavan (1992–1994) (Tagalog Version)
 Shaider (1997–1999) (Tagalog Version)

Cartoons
 Animaniacs BraveStarr Cartoon Hour Children's Animated Classics Magical World of Disney My Little Pony and Friends Sammy and Jimie (2018–2019)
 TransformersASEAN
 ASEAN: Community and Its Three Pillars (2017-2022)
 ASEAN @ 50: Historical Milestones (2018-2022)

Drama
 Beasts of Asia (season 2) (2022-2023)
Korean dramas
 Here Comes Mr. Oh (2014–2015, 2015–2016)
 The Legendary Doctor: Hur Jun (2017)

Chinese dramas
 Beijing Love Story (2018)
 Jimao (2018)

Sports coverage

 1978 World Basketball Championship Manila (with BBC 2)
 1980 Moscow Olympics
 1984 Los Angeles Olympics
 1988 Seoul Olympics
 1996 Atlanta Olympics
 2000 Sydney Olympics (with ABC 5)
 2004 Athens Olympics
 1978 Bangkok Asian Games
 1982 New Delhi Asian Games
 1986 Seoul Asian Games
 1994 Hiroshima Asian Games (with Vintage Television)
 2002 Busan Asian Games
 2006 Doha Asian Games (with Solar Sports)
 1977 Kuala Lumpur SEA Games
 1979 Jakarta SEA Games
 1981 Manila SEA Games (with BBC 2)
 1983 Singapore SEA Games
 1985 Bangkok SEA Games
 1987 Jakarta SEA Games
 1989 Kuala Lumpur SEA Games
 1991 Manila SEA Games (with ABS-CBN, GMA IBC and RPN)
 1992 Southeast Asian Fencing Federation Championships (December 25, 1992)
 1995 Chiang Mai SEA Games
 1997 Jakarta SEA Games
 1999 Brunei Darussalam SEA Games
 2001 Kuala Lumpur SEA Games
 2003 Vietnam SEA Games (together with Jemah Television and ABC 5)
 2005 Philippines SEA Games (with IBC & ABC "now TV5")
 2007 Nakhon Ratchasima SEA Games (with IBC 13 and ABC 5)
 2009 Ventianne SEA Games (with ABS-CBN and TV5)
 2017 Kuala Lumpur SEA Games (with TV5 and AksyonTV for Basketball matches only)
 2019
Philippines SEA Games (with ABS-CBN 2 and TV5)
 IAAF World Championships in Athletics (2007, 2009, 2013)
 MBA Games (2001–2002) (with ABS-CBN Sports)
 MICAA on GTV/MBS (1974–1981)
 Mosconi Cup (2003–2005)
 NBA All-Star Game (2002)
 NBA Playoffs (2002)
 NBA Finals (2002)
 NCAA Games (1995, 2000—2001) (with Vintage Television and Silverstar Sports)
 Nissan Challengers Philippines Tennis (December 25, 1992)
 PBA on GTV/MBS (1978–1981)
 PBA on Vintage Sports (1984–1995)
 PBA on NBN/IBC (2003)
 PCSO Presidential Gold Horse Racing Cup (December 13, 2015)
 PTV Sports: Palarong Pambansa Special Coverage (April 22–26, 28, 2013; May 5–9, 12, 2014, May 4–8, 11, 2015)
 UAAP Games (1995–1999) (with Silverstar Sports)
 World Pool Championship
 World Series on PTV (1987–1993)

TV specials

 1995 World Youth Day Coverage (January 10–15, 1995, together with GMA 7)
 2nd ASEAN-Japan TV Festival 2017 (September 2017)
 50th Anniversary of Leyte Landing (1994)
 The 60th Anniversary of Korean-Philippine Diplomatic Relations Friendship Festival (2009)
 Aliw Awards (1994–2009; 2012)
 Anak TV Seal Awards (January 12, 2014)
 Asean Quiz National Competition (2009; 2012; February 15, 2014)
 Asian Television Awards (December 1, 2022)
 Awit Awards (1989–2009)
 AFP-PNP Singing Contest Grand Finals & Dance Contests Finals (2009)
 Bayanihan para sa Hagdang Palayan: A RTVM Special Feature (October 2013)
 Battle of the Brains Grand Finals (2000–2001)
 Buhay ni Kristo (produced by Family Rosary Crusade)
 Car Of The Year 2014 of the Car Awards Group, Inc - Auto Review Special (February 22, 2014)
 Canonization Of Blessed Lorenzo Ruiz PTV Special Coverage (October 18, 1987)
 Canonization Of Blessed Pedro Calungsod PTV Special Coverage (October 21, 2012)
 Cavite Oathtaking and Accomplishment Report (June 2010)
 Christmas Eve Mass at Vatican (delayed telecast; December 25, 2013)
 CSC Dangal ng Bayan Awards Special Feature (February 2014)
 Catholic Mass Media Awards (1984–1991)
 The Challenge of EDSA
 The Coming of the King: A Christmas Legend by Fr. James B. Reuter, S.J. (December 21, 2013)
 Diwang Bonifacio sa Makabagong Panahon (November 30, 1997)
 Easter Vigil Mass @ Vatican (1977–ongoing)
 EDSAGram (February 2015)
 EDSA Uno People Power Anniversary TV Special (February 24–25, Yearly)
 FAMAS Awards (2012)
 Family Rosary Crusade Holy Week Special (April 17–19, 2014, April 2–4, 2015)
 Feast of the Solemnity of the Motherhood of Mary (December 31, 2013)
 Gilbert Teodoro's Miting de Avance (May 8, 2010)
 Hamon at Pagbangon: PTV News Yearender Report (December 31, 2013)
 Highlights 2009: The NBN Year-End Repory (December 31, 2009)
 Highlights 2010: The NBN Year-End Report (December 31, 2010)
 Highlights 2011: The PTNI Year-End Report (December 31, 2011)
 Highlights 2012: The PTV Year-End Report (December 31, 2012)
 Highlights 2013: The PTV Year-End Report (December 31, 2013)
 Highlights 2014: The PTV Year-End Report (December 31, 2014)
 Highlights 2015: The PTV Year-End Report (December 31, 2015)
 Highlights 2016: The PTV Year-End Report (December 31, 2016)
 Hatol ng Bayan Election Coverage (1987, 1988, 1992, 1995, 1998, 2001, 2004, 2007, 2010, 2013, 2016, 2019, 2022; together with RPN 9 (2004–2010) and IBC 13 (2004–present))
 Japan-Asean Music Fest 2013 (December 29, 2013)
 Jo Anne Lorenzana: In High Spirits Concert TV Special (March 2, 1989)
 Joyride Milestones of Infrastructure Development Documentary Special (May 2010)
 Kundiman Fiesta Grand Finals Night (December 9, 1996)
 Kabanata 2022: Bagong Simula The PTV Year-End Special (December 31, 2022)
 The Last Journey of Ninoy (2009)
 Luna Awards (2007, 2009)
 Life Of Christ (Sorrowful Mysteries) (produced by Family Rosary Crusade) (April 2, 2012, April 2, 2015, April 4, 2015)
 2014 Malangsi Festival Special Feature (April 12, 2014)
 Mga Misteryo ng Luwalhati (produced by Family Rosary Crusade) (April 3, 2012, April 2, 2015, April 4, 2015)
 Metro Manila Film Festival Awards Night (December 27, 1982)
 Metropop All-Star Special (December 28, 1982)
 Pistang Milenyo Filipino (together with ABC 5 now TV5, RPN and IBC, December 31, 1999 – January 1, 2000)
 Miss Casino Filipino Grand Coronation Night (2010–present)
 Miss Cebu (PTV-11 Cebu)
 National Quiz Bee (1980–2001)
 Ninoy: The Heart and the Soul (August 21, 1988)
 One Nation in Prayer: National Day of Prayer Special Coverage (January 20, 2014)
 Out of the Box: A Concert of the Philippine Philharmonic Orchestra for the 150th Birth Anniversary of Andres Bonifacio (December 1, 2013)
 Out of the Box: A Concert of the Philippine Philharmonic Orchestra/FEU Bamboo Band for the Theme "Save the Tam" (January 26, 2014)
 Out of the Box, Love Is: A Concert of the Philippine Philharmonic Orchestra for the Love Month (March 16, 2014)
 Out of the Box: Volunteerism, A Christmas Concert of the Philippine Philharmonic Orchestra (December 22, 2013)
 Paalam... Pangulong Cory (August 1–5, 2009)
 Pagsisiyasat: PDAF Scamdalo, Senate Blue Ribbon Committee Hearing on Pork Barrel Scam Coverage (2013–February 13, 2014)
 Pagusbong ng mga Pangarap sa Hacienda Luisita - A PTV Special Report (November 2013)
 Palm Sunday Family Recollection (Yearly)
 Panahon Na!: Ang Pinoy at ang Laban sa Climate Change (2009)
 Panahon.TV: New Year's Countdown (December 31, 2013 - January 1, 2014)
 Panawagan Election Coverage (1980, 1981, 1984 and 1986)
 Para sa Bayan 2017: The PTV News Year-End Report (December 31, 2017)
 Para sa Bayan: A PTV Year-Ender (December 31, 2018)
 Para sa Bayan: Ang Kwento ng PTV''
 Philippine Collegiate Peace Debates (September 29, 2013)
 Philippine Marine Biodiversity Video Documentary by Sen. Loren Legarda (May 2014)
 Philippine Military Academy Graduation Rites (March, yearly)
 People Power 20th Anniversary Documentary Special (2006)
 Promulgation of the Preamble of the 1987 Philippine Live Constitution (December 4, 2013)
 Puso at Diwa ni Ninoy (1988)
 Saint Lorenzo Ruiz: The Life, A 1st Filipino Saint Documentary Special (November 1987)
 Salamat po, Pangulong Gloria Documentary Special (April–July 2010)
 San Miguel Corporation 97th Anniversary Concert Special (September 29, 1987)
 Ship of Southeast Asian Youth Program Voyage: 40 Years of Advocacy and Action (December 14, 2013)
 Signing of the Comprehensive Agreement of the BANGSAMORO (March 27, 2014)
 Story Book: PTV Sports Year-Ender Special (December 31, 2012-ongoing)
 Sundalong Pangkapayapaan, Army Transformation Program Documentary of 67th IB of Phil. Army and PTV Davao (January 18, 2014)
 Tragedy, Tears and Triumph: NewsLife Yearender Special (December 31, 2013)
 Tulong ng Bayan Yolanda Watch: Media ng Bayan Special Coverage (November 7–25, 2013)
 United Colors of Cosplay Crossing Borders (February 23, 2014)
 UST Christmas Gala Concert (December 2009-December 25, 2013)
 A Vision Worth Dying For: PTV Documentary Special on Ninoy Aquino (August 20, 2013)
 Voice of Asia Speech Competition (April 2013)
 The Year-End Report: A PTV News Special (December 2012)
 Yolanda: Ang Pagbangon: A RTVM Special Feature (January 19, 2014)

See also
 People's Television Network
 List of Philippine television shows
 List of programs broadcast by People's Television Network

Notes

References

People's Television Network
 
People's Television Network